Westway is a census-designated place (CDP) in El Paso County, Texas, United States. The population was 4,188 at the 2010 census. It is part of the El Paso Metropolitan Statistical Area. The ZIP Code encompassing the CDP area is 79835.

Geography
Westway is located at  (31.959214, -106.574169).

Demographics

2020 census

As of the 2020 United States census, there were 3,811 people, 1,092 households, and 796 families residing in the CDP.

2000 census
As of the census of 2000, there were 3,829 people, 912 households, and 850 families residing in the CDP. The population density was 2,899.0 people per square mile (1,120.0/km2). There were 1,005 housing units at an average density of 760.9/sq mi (294.0/km2). The racial makeup of the CDP was 98.20% White, 0.47% African American, 0.03% Asian, 0.99% from other races, and 0.31% from two or more races. Hispanic or Latino of any race were 97.47% of the population.

There were 812 households, out of which 54.6% had children under the age of 18 living with them, 71.3% were married couples living together, 17.2% had a female householder with no husband present, and 6.7% were non-families. 5.9% of all households were made up of individuals, and 2.2% had someone living alone who was 65 years of age or older. The average household size was 7.20 and the average family size was 9.36.

In the CDP, the population was spread out, with 41.2% under the age of 18, 11.4% from 18 to 24, 28.2% from 25 to 44, 14.8% from 45 to 64, and 4.4% who were 65 years of age or older. The median age was 23 years. For every 100 females, there were 97.0 males. For every 100 females age 18 and over, there were 88.9 males.

The median income for a household in the CDP was $28,439, and the median income for a family was $25,134. Males had a median income of $19,197 versus $10,157 for females. The per capita income for the CDP was $2,636. About 35.2% of families and 36.8% of the population were below the poverty line, including 43.9% of those under age 18 and 27.5% of those age 65 or over.

Education

Westway is served by the Canutillo Independent School District. Davenport Elementary School is located in the community, and it is zoned to Davenport for pre-kindergarten to fifth grades, and to Alderete Middle School in Canutillo for sixth to eighth grades. High school students attend Canutillo High School and may also attend Northwest High School, the district's early-college magnet high school, should they qualify for admission.

References

Census-designated places in El Paso County, Texas
Census-designated places in Texas